The MultiLink Procedure (MLP) (Subscription-time selectable option) exists as an added upper sublayer of the data link layer, operating between the packet layer and a multiplicity of single data link protocol functions (SLPs) in the data link layer. A MultiLink Procedure (MLP) must perform the functions of accepting packets from the Packet Layer, distributing those packets across the available DCE or DTE SLPs for transmission to the DTE or DCE SLPs, respectively, and resequencing the packets received from the DTE or DCE SLPs for delivery to the DTE or DCE Packet Layer, respectively.

MLP is an extension of LAPB that allows for multiple physical links, thus providing better throughput. A device that has multiple LAPB links will implement MLP as an upper-layer management protocol to allocate frames to the links. MLP sees the multiple LAPB links as a pool of links for transmitting information from higher-layer protocols as frames. Higher-level software does not need to be aware that multiple links exist. The MLP layer handles distributing frames among the links, and thus gives upper layers full access to the links.

External links
Cisco Frame Relay documentation

Link access protocols
Link protocols